Narendra Ahuja is an Indian-American computer scientist and the Donald Biggar Willett Professor Emeritus in Engineering at the University of Illinois at Urbana–Champaign. His research primarily concerns computer vision and pattern recognition.

Education and career
Ahuja earned a bachelor's degree in 1972 from the Birla Institute of Technology and Science in India. He earned a master's degree in 1974 from the Indian Institute of Science, and completed a Ph.D. in computer science in 1979 from the University of Maryland, College Park, advised by Azriel Rosenfeld. In addition to his work at the University of Illinois, he was founding director of the International Institute of Information Technology, Hyderabad from 1999 to 2002.

Awards and honors
Ahuja was the 1998 recipient of the SPIE Technology Achievement Award, and the 1999 recipient of the IEEE Emanuel R. Piore Award "for contributions to computer vision and image processing".
The professional societies in which he is a fellow include the American Association for the Advancement of Science, Association for the Advancement of Artificial Intelligence, Association for Computing Machinery, Institute of Electrical and Electronics Engineers, International Association for Pattern Recognition, and International Society for Optical Engineering.

References

External links

Year of birth missing (living people)
Living people
Computer engineers
Birla Institute of Technology and Science, Pilani alumni
Indian Institute of Science alumni
University of Maryland, College Park alumni
University of Illinois Urbana-Champaign faculty
Fellows of the American Association for the Advancement of Science
Fellows of the Association for Computing Machinery
Fellow Members of the IEEE
Fellows of the International Association for Pattern Recognition
Fellows of the Association for the Advancement of Artificial Intelligence